Manoba argentalis is a moth in the  family Nolidae. It was described by Frederic Moore in 1867. It is found in Sikkim, India.

The larvae have been recorded feeding on Castanopsis indica.

References

Moths described in 1867
Nolinae